Rogério de Albuquerque Corrêa (born 27 March 1981), known as Rogério Corrêa, is a Brazilian football manager and former player who played as a central defender. He is the current manager of Volta Redonda.

Playing career
A Flamengo youth graduate, Corrêa moved to Bangu in 2001, and made his senior debut in the year's Série C. In 2002, he joined Vasco da Gama, and won the 2003 Campeonato Carioca with the club.

Corrêa returned to Bangu in 2004, after featuring rarely for Vasco. He subsequently represented Joinville, 15 de Novembro and Brasiliense before signing for Super League Greece side Levadiakos in August 2005.

Back to Brazil in 2006, Corrêa had a brief stint at Angra dos Reis before agreeing to a contract with Botafogo in December 2006. He left the club on 26 March 2007, after failing to make a single appearance, and signed a one-year deal with Ceará the following day.

After leaving Ceará, Corrêa resumed his career in the lower leagues, playing for Bonsucesso, Anápolis, Uberlândia, Remo, Paysandu (two stints) and CRB. He retired from professional football with the latter in 2010, aged 29, and subsequently played seven-a-side football, being named the best player of the sport in 2013.

Managerial career
After being an assistant manager at Portuguesa-RJ and Moto Club, Corrêa was named manager of the former side on 20 April 2018. He resigned on 3 October 2020, and took over Artsul just four days later.

On 23 December 2020, Corrêa was appointed in charge of Cabofriense for the upcoming season. The following 2 March, after being knocked out in the preliminary stage of the 2021 Campeonato Carioca, he left the club.

On 25 November 2021, Corrêa was named at the helm of 4 de Julho. He opted to leave the club on 21 March of the following year, to take over Volta Redonda.

Honours

Player
Vasco
Campeonato Carioca: 2003

Manager
Volta Redonda
Campeonato Carioca Série A2: 2022
Copa Rio: 2022

References

External links
 Futebol de Goyaz profile 
 

1981 births
Living people
Footballers from Rio de Janeiro (city)
Brazilian footballers
Association football defenders
Campeonato Brasileiro Série A players
Campeonato Brasileiro Série C players
Bangu Atlético Clube players
CR Vasco da Gama players
Clube 15 de Novembro players
Brasiliense Futebol Clube players
Anápolis Futebol Clube players
Uberlândia Esporte Clube players
Clube do Remo players
Paysandu Sport Club players
Clube de Regatas Brasil players
Super League Greece players
Levadiakos F.C. players
Brazilian expatriate footballers
Brazilian expatriate sportspeople in Greece
Expatriate footballers in Greece
Brazilian football managers
Campeonato Brasileiro Série D managers
Associação Atlética Portuguesa (RJ) managers
Associação Desportiva Cabofriense managers
Volta Redonda Futebol Clube managers